Gustav Brecher (5 February 1879 – May 1940) was a German conductor, composer, and music critic. As director of the Leipzig Opera, he conducted world premieres of works by Ernst Krenek and Kurt Weill, including Jonny spielt auf and Rise and Fall of the City of Mahagonny. He was dismissed by the Nazis in 1933, lived at risk in Stalingrad, Berlin, Prague, and finally Ostend, where he took his life together with his wife's.

Life 
Brecher was born in Eichwald, Ore Mountains, then in Austria-Hungary. His Jewish family moved from Bohemia to Leipzig in 1889. Brecher was taught there by Salomon Jadassohn. Richard Strauss conducted his tone poem Rosmersholm in 1896. Brecher made his debut in 1897 at the Leipzig Opera. From 1901, he conducted at the Vienna Court Opera alongside Gustav Mahler. Between 1903 and 1911 he was Kapellmeister at the Hamburg State Opera, where he conducted the world premiere of Busoni's Die Brautwahl. After conducting at the Cologne Opera and Oper Frankfurt, Brecher was Generalmusikdirektor (GMD) at the Leipzig Opera from 1914. He was particularly controversial there because of the premieres of Krenek's operas Jonny spielt auf and Leben des Orest, and Weill's Rise and Fall of the City of Mahagonny:

Although the Jonny opera was a success, Brecher was dismissed after the Nazis seized power in the spring of 1933, based on the Law for the Restoration of the Professional Civil Service. In the Neue Zeitschrift für Musik, the musicologist Alfred Heuß wrote a malicious commentary on the occasion of the Rienzi performance during the Wagner Festival week on 12 February 1933: "Unsuspecting, Brecher handled his peculiarly small baton for the last time in a Wagner performance." His last appearance in Leipzig was probably Weill's Der Silbersee on 4 March 1933, when he left the podium during the performance because of constant roaring by the SA present, who were attacking his Jewish origins and objecting to the opera. The mayor of Leipzig, Carl Friedrich Goerdeler, granted him leave on 11 March 1933. His path into exile cannot be traced in detail. He conducted the radio orchestra in Leningrad in five concerts. There in 1934, Georges Sébastian wrote:

Brecher lived in Berlin for a while, when Erich Ebermayer noted on 13 October 1935 in his diary:

Brecher moved to Prague, where he had to flee once more in 1938. He spent almost a year in Ostend, from spring 1939 to May 1940, staying first the Hôtel Wellington and then at the Hôtel Littoral, both on the seafront. He was with his wife Gertrud Deutsch (daughter of Felix Deutsch), his mother-in-law, Elisabeth 'Lili' Kahn Deutsch and her housekeeper/maid, Hermine Voigtmann. The latter, who was not Jewish, left Ostend in August 1939 The fate of the Brecher family is not known but they disappeared without a trace around May 1940 when the Germans occupied Belgium. Their files in the Algemeen Rijksarchief in Brussels retrospectively state they 'left for England'. It is not certain if they committed suicide or perished at sea.

A Stolperstein in front of the Hamburg State Opera reminds of his fate.

Further reading 
 Jürgen Schebera: Gustav Brecher und die Leipziger Oper 1923–1933. With a contribution by Heinrich Creuzburg: Erinnerungen an Gustav Brecher. Edition Peters, Leipzig 1990 
 Richard Wagner gepfändet: ein Leipziger Denkmal in Dokumenten 1931–1955. Ausgewählt und begleitet von Grit Hartmann. Forum-Verlag, Leipzig 2003, . 
 Hannes Heer, Jürgen Kesting, : Verstummte Stimmen: die Bayreuther Festspiele und die "Juden" 1876 bis 1945; eine Ausstellung. Festspielpark Bayreuth und Ausstellungshalle Neues Rathaus Bayreuth, 22. Juli bis 14. Oktober 2012. Metropol, Berlin 2012 , 26

References

External links 
 Nachlassverzeichnis in the Zentralbibliothek Zürich
 
 Jitka Balatková: Eine kurze Nachricht über Gustav Brecher in Olmütz
 

German conductors (music)
20th-century German composers
Music directors
1879 births
1940 suicides
People from Teplice
Suicides by Jews during the Holocaust
German Jews who died in the Holocaust
Suicides in Belgium